The Florianópolis Challenger is a professional tennis tournament played on clay courts. It is currently part of the ATP Challenger Tour. It is held in Florianópolis, Brazil.

Past finals

Singles

Doubles

References

ATP Challenger Tour
Clay court tennis tournaments
Tennis tournaments in Brazil
Recurring sporting events established in 2021